The EDL Peloux Bridge near Buffalo, Wyoming, is a Pratt pony truss bridge that was built in 1912 by the Canton Bridge Company. The bridge carries Johnson County Road CN16-40 across Clear Creek. The bridge was placed on the National Register of Historic Places in 1985 as part of a Multiple Property Submission devoted to historic bridges in Wyoming The bridge was relocated to Buffalo City Park in 1986.

See also
List of bridges documented by the Historic American Engineering Record in Wyoming

References

External links

Road bridges on the National Register of Historic Places in Wyoming
Bridges completed in 1912
Buildings and structures in Buffalo, Wyoming
Transportation in Johnson County, Wyoming
Historic American Engineering Record in Wyoming
1912 establishments in Wyoming
National Register of Historic Places in Johnson County, Wyoming
Steel bridges in the United States